Andy Donato is an editorial cartoonist and former art director for the Toronto Sun.

Life and career
Donato graduated from Danforth Collegiate and Technical Institute and worked at Eaton's as a layout artist. He joined the Toronto Telegram in 1961, working as a graphic artist in the promotion department. In 1968, he was appointed art director and began cartooning on a part-time basis. After The Telegram folded in 1971, he joined The Toronto Sun. In 1974, he started cartooning full-time. In 1985 and 1986, he served as president of the Association of American Editorial Cartoonists.

He is well known among Sun readers for his signature image of a bird, "Donato's bird." Finding the bird, lost in the newspaper, has been a common device in Sun promotions through the years.

Some of his most famous work was done when Pierre Elliott Trudeau was Prime Minister and Joe Clark was leader of the official opposition. As the two leaders battled it out, Donato lampooned both of them extensively. For years, Joe Clark was drawn wearing children's mittens (attached to his suit with strings), a reference to the time his luggage went missing on a trip to Israel. The final cartoon of the series appeared after Trudeau's airplane was hit by a bus while on the tarmac. It showed a puzzled Trudeau staring at the bus while one of his aides held up Clark's mittens and said: "We don't know who the driver was, but we found his mittens."

A notable cartoon was a blank cell titled "Canada's foreign ownership policy" - a parody of Canada's lack of controls over foreign ownership of Canadian companies.

One famous Donato cartoon, which was widely reproduced in the United States and is now in the Library of Congress was published during the Iranian hostage crisis. Titled "The American Dream", it is a parody of the famous photograph of the Raising the Flag on Iwo Jima but depicts the Iwo Jima marines raising the US flag while standing on a prostrate Ayatollah Khomeini.

Although Donato's work is mostly praised, he was criticized when his cartoon comparing David Miller with Adolf Hitler was published after Miller refused to allow a debate on Chief Julian Fantino's contract renewal.

It is said that many Canadian politicians consider it an honour if Donato pillories them. When he drew a picture of Liberal MP Carolyn Parrish with both feet stuck in her mouth - Parrish requested the original drawing. Other politicians have done the same, many times. According to his friends, Donato's philosophy was: "The first time any politician is targeted, he, or she, gets the original drawing on request."

Donato formally retired from the Sun in 1997 but continues to draw for the Sun chain on a contract basis that pays him roughly $400 a cartoon.

Donato had a dispute with the Canada Revenue Agency over the manner in which he was donating some of his works to certain educational institutions in 1999 and 2001. He was partially successful in his appeal to the Tax Court of Canada, and was awarded costs in the case. The judgment was sustained on appeal to the Federal Court of Appeal.

Donato is also a landscape artist working in a style he calls "bent realism". His paintings mostly depict urban landscapes, particularly Toronto neighbourhoods. He has been the subject of exhibitions in Toronto, New York City, London, and Johannesburg featuring his paintings from 1965 to present.

Quotes 
"A cartoonist is a like a blind javelin thrower at the Olympics. He's not too accurate, but he sure gets the attention of the spectators."

References

External links 
 A picture of him
 Oil paintings by Donato

Living people
Artists from Toronto
Canadian editorial cartoonists
Canadian landscape painters
People from Scarborough, Toronto
Toronto Sun people
20th-century Canadian painters
Canadian male painters
21st-century Canadian painters
Journalists from Toronto
20th-century Canadian male artists
21st-century Canadian male artists
Year of birth missing (living people)